Enrique de Chávarri (10 January 1903 – 28 April 1993) was a Spanish sprinter. He competed in the men's 100 metres at the 1928 Summer Olympics. He also played in the hockey tournament at the 1928 Summer Olympics.

References

External links
 

1903 births
1993 deaths
Athletes (track and field) at the 1928 Summer Olympics
Field hockey players at the 1928 Summer Olympics
Spanish male sprinters
Spanish male field hockey players
Olympic athletes of Spain
Olympic field hockey players of Spain
Athletes from Madrid